Madera Latino: A Latin Jazz Perspective on the Music of Woody Shaw is an album by Brian Lynch and various artists. It earned Lynch a Grammy Award nomination for Best Latin Jazz Album.

References

2016 albums
Brian Lynch (musician) albums